Burak-class corvette (Turkish: Burak sınıfı korvet), also known as the B-class corvette, is a warship class of the Turkish Navy, all ex- A69 type aviso corvettes, mainly designed for coastal anti-submarine defense and ocean escort missions. Their robust design and economical propulsion system allows them to be used for distant overseas operations.

A total of six ships under the Burak class are being operated by the Turkish Naval Forces and will be phased out with introduction of Ada-class corvettes.

Ships
 , formerly Commandant de Pimodan (F787)
 , formerly Drogou (F783). Retired in 2022.
 , formerly Quartier-Maître Anquetil (F786)
 , formerly D'Estienne d'Orves (F781)
 , formerly Amyot d'Inville (F782)
 , formerly Second-Maître Le Bihan (F788)

References

Sources
B (A-69) class corvette

External links

Official Turkish Navy Website 
Turkish Navy

 
Corvette classes